The Moroto Ateker Cement Company Limited (MACCL) is a manufacturer of cement in Uganda.

Location

Ownership
Moroto Ateker Cement Company Limited is a joint venture company between Savannah Mines Limited, a private company, and Uganda Development Corporation, a government parastatal. The shareholding in the shares of stock of the company, is as depicted in the table below.

Construction
Saboo Technologies Limited of India carried out a feasibility study, to establish the costs, raw materials, and project longevity of production. According to their findings, the project is expected to cost US$225 million (Shs765 billion). Of this, about US$200 million (Shs680 billion) will be spent on plant and machinery and the remaining  US$25 million (Shs85 billion), will be spent on operational expenses. The project will be developed in two phases.

UDC and Savannah Mines are looking towards awarding the construction contract to Saboo Technologies, based on Saboo's experience in building cement plants in Ethiopia and Djibouti. The project is awaiting approval from the Ugandan cabinet and from  Uganda's parliament.

See also
 List of cement manufacturers in Uganda
 List of companies and cities in Africa that manufacture cement

References

External links
Ugandan government to build cement plant in Karamoja
Cement industry in huge leaps as public projects push up demand As 21 December 2016.

Manufacturing companies established in 2016
2016 establishments in Uganda
Moroto District
Economy of Uganda
Northern Region, Uganda
Cement companies of Uganda